Joan de Beauchamp may refer to:
 Joan Butler, Countess of Ormond (1396–1430), daughter of William de Beauchamp, 1st Baron Bergavenny and Lady Joan FitzAlan
 Joan de Beauchamp, Baroness Bergavenny (1375–1435), English noblewoman, wife of William de Beauchamp, 1st Baron Bergavenny of the Welsh Marches
 Joan de Beauchamp, sister of William de Beauchamp, 9th Earl of Warwick
 Joan de Beauchamp, daughter of Thomas de Beauchamp, 11th Earl of Warwick and Lady Katherine Mortimer